Asa Griggs (September 13, 1923 – June 11, 2007), nicknamed "Skeet", was an American Negro league second baseman in the 1940s and 1950s.

A native of Union Springs, Alabama, Griggs was the brother of fellow Negro leaguer Wiley Griggs. Older brother Acie graduated from A. H. Parker High School and Alabama A&M University, and served in the US Navy during World War II. He played for the New York Cubans in 1948, and joined the Birmingham Black Barons in 1949, where he played through 1957. Griggs died in Birmingham, Alabama in 2007 at age 83.

References

External links
 and Seamheads
 Acie Griggs at Negro Leagues Baseball Museum

1923 births
2007 deaths
Atlanta Black Crackers players
Birmingham Black Barons players
New York Cubans players
20th-century African-American sportspeople
21st-century African-American people
Baseball infielders